Præsten i Vejlby (The Vicar of Vejlby) is a 1931 Danish film about a murder in a vicarage directed by George Schnéevoigt and based on a novel by Steen Steensen Blicher. Starring Henrik Malberg and Karin Nellemose it marked the debut of actor Aage Winther-Jørgensen. The film was a remake of the 1920 version by August Blom; and was remade again in 1972 by Claus Ørsted.

One year earlier, George Schnéevoigt had made the first Danish sound film of feature length; however, the dialogue was spoken in Norwegian. Præsten i Vejlby was the first feature-length sound film with Danish dialogue. Although the public had seen short Danish "talkies" since 1923, and experienced foreign features with sound for two years, the Danish language film was unique enough to create a huge success and make the film very profitable.

Cast
Henrik Malberg ...  Præsten Søren Quist
Karin Nellemose ...  Præstedatteren Mette Quist
Eyvind Johan-Svendsen ...  Herredsfogeden Erik Sørensen
Mathilde Nielsen ...  Moster Gertrud
Gerhard Jessen ...  Storbonden Morten Bruus
Kai Holm ...  Karlen Niels Bruus
Aage Winther-Jørgensen ...  Musicerende præst
Holger-Madsen
Gudrun Nissen
Bent Froda ...  Organist

External links
 

1931 films
1931 crime films
1930s historical films
Danish crime films
Danish historical films
1930s Danish-language films
Films directed by George Schnéevoigt
Films set in the 1620s
Films set in the 1640s
Remakes of Danish films
Sound film remakes of silent films
Danish black-and-white films